Gymnázium Třebíč is a universal gymnasium in  town quarter Horka Domky in Třebíč opposite the Třebíč government buildings. Near the school there are also the Obchodní akademie Dr. Albína Bráfa and Hotelová škola Třebíč schools.

Present 
The gymnasium is one of the main secondary schools in Třebíč. 46 teachers and about six hundred students are now there. They are taught languages (French, English, German, Russian and earlier Latin) and natural sciences. This gymnasium is divided to The New building and The Old building. Both halves are joined. The Old building built in 1871. After eighteen years, in 1889, Třebíč built The New building and in year 1994 was expanded. There are twenty classes: 1.-8.G, 1.-4. A, B, C.

External links 
 The official web page of Gymnázium Třebíč 

Schools in Třebíč